Nere may refer to:

People 
 Mitchell Nere (born 1988), Indonesian footballer
 Nicolae Nere (born 1981), Romanian rugby union player
 Rully Nere (born 1957), Indonesian football coach

Places 
 Néré, a commune in the Charente-Maritime department, France
 Nere, Mulshi, a village in Maharashtra, India
 Lac Nère, a lake in Hautes-Pyrénées, France

Other uses 
 Nerë language